Charlot Salwai Tabimasmas (born 24 April 1963) is a Vanuatuan politician, former accountant, and political advisor. He was the Prime Minister of Vanuatu, having been elected on 11 February 2016 following the 2016 general election, and dismissed on 20 April 2020 following the 2020 general election. He is the leader of the Reunification of Movements for Change (RMC), which is part of the Unity for Change bloc. Salwai is a Francophone from Pentecost Island.

Biography
Born in 1963, he learned speaking French as a teenager. He attended Bourail College to obtain his General Education Certificate, Bourail Technical College to obtain his Technical Education Certificate, and Lycée Blaise Pascal in Nouméa for his Baccalauréat technologique G2.

Salwai had previously served as Minister for Trade and Industries, Minister for Lands and Natural Resources, Minister for Education, Minister for Finance and Economic Management (2012-2013), and Minister of Internal Affairs. He has also served as Chairman of the Public Accounts Committee, Leader of the Opposition Whip, and Deputy Opposition Leader.

In August 2016, he was re-elected as leader of the RMC. In late November 2016 Salwai survived an attempt at a motion of no-confidence, with MP's being divided on procedural points regarding the motion and attachment of a summons. In August 2020 he, former cabinet ministers Matai Seremaiah and Jerome Ludvaune and former MP Tom Korr were committed to the Supreme Court on charges of bribery and corruption over allegations he had bribed MPs who had signed the motion. Salwai was also charged with perjury.

Salwai is a Protestant Christian and is able to speak some English. In the summer of 2017, he appeared in South Korea at the RUTC "World Remnant Conference".

Salwai stood trial from November 23, 2020, charged with 10 counts of bribery and corruption. He and his former Minister of Health were acquitted of bribery on December 8. On December 16, 2020, Salwai was convicted of perjury, and given a suspended sentence. He was pardoned by the President of Vanuatu, Tallis Obed Moses, in September 2021, which restores his eligibility to run for public office again.

References

1963 births
Prime Ministers of Vanuatu
Finance Ministers of Vanuatu
Interior ministers of Vanuatu
Trade ministers of Vanuatu
Industry ministers of Vanuatu
Education ministers of Vanuatu
Government ministers of Vanuatu
Living people
Reunification Movement for Change politicians
People from Penama Province
Place of birth missing (living people)
Vanuatuan accountants
Vanuatuan Protestants
Members of the Parliament of Vanuatu